The statues known as Mariblanca  are female figures of uncertain origin which may relate to the fertility  goddesses Venus or Fortuna.

The name, which is common in Spanish relates to a statue  which was purchased in the year 1625 by a Florentine  merchant Ludovico Turchi as a  gift  to crown the lost Fountain of Faith in Madrid.

It is now the only element that remains of this monumental fountain, which was located on the church of Good Faith, which formerly stood in the Puerta del Sol.

There are now a number of copies and similar statues also known as Mariblanca. The origin of which is uncertain, but may relate to a religious anxiety related to idolatry or pagan representations of purity, fertility and grace other than those associated with the Virgin Mary.

Mariblanca  also serves as a female Christian name.

See also
Fountain de La Mariblanca
Fountain of the Harpies

References

Sculptures in Spain
17th-century sculptures